Il Darrehsi (also Romanized as Īl Darrehsī) is a village in Mulan Rural District, in the Central District of Kaleybar County, East Azerbaijan Province, Iran. At the 2006 census, its population was 19, in 4 families.

References 

Populated places in Kaleybar County